The Redhead and the Cowboy is a 1951 American Western film directed by Leslie Fenton and starring Glenn Ford and Rhonda Fleming.

Plot 
Late in the American Civil War, the New Mexico Territory is full of spies and guerrillas for both sides. Local cowboy Gil Kyle, realizing that many of these people are merely criminals out for themselves, tries to do his work and steer clear of the conflict. But he keeps running into violence and hostility. And after a brief encounter with a beautiful new saloon girl, he stumbles into a crime scene and becomes a fugitive wanted for murder.

His only alibi is the girl, Candace Bronson, who has disappeared. She turns out to be aiding the Confederate cause, and has fled to deliver a vital message about a Union gold shipment. Kyle sets off in pursuit of her. Along the way, he runs into desperadoes, government agents, guerrilla fighters, and renegades—some whose true loyalties are unclear.

Cast 
Glenn Ford as Gil Kyle 
Edmond O'Brien as Maj. Dunn Jeffers (Union intelligence officer) 
Rhonda Fleming as Candace Bronson 
Alan Reed as Col. Lamartine (Confederate leader) 
Morris Ankrum as the Sheriff 
Edith Evanson as Mrs. Barrett 
Perry Ivins  as Mr. Barrett (owner, Lazy Y Ranch) 
Janine Perreau as Mary Barrett 
Douglas Spencer as Perry (Union agent) 
Ray Teal as Brock (Union agent) 
Ralph Byrd as  Capt. Andrews 
King Donovan as Munro (Lamartine's henchman) 
Tom Moore as Gus (bartender, Golden Trail Saloon 
Jeff York as Lt. Wylie (uncredited)
Emory Parnell as Northern Sympathizer Barfly

References

Further reading

External links 

1951 films
1951 Western (genre) films
American black-and-white films
American Civil War films
American Western (genre) films
Films directed by Leslie Fenton
Films scored by David Buttolph
Paramount Pictures films
1950s English-language films
1950s American films